The IEEE William E. Newell Power Electronics Award is a Technical Field Award of the IEEE that was established by the IEEE Board of Directors in 2005. This award is presented annually for outstanding contribution(s) to the advancement of power electronics. The award is named in honor of William E. Newell.

This award may be presented to an individual only.

Recipients of this award receive a bronze medal, certificate, and honorarium.

Recipients 
The following people received the IEEE William E. Newell Power Electronics Award:

 2021: Robert W. Erickson
 2020: Ivo Barbi 
 2019: Patrizio Vinciarelli
 2018: Rainer Marquardt
 2017: Seung-Ki Sul
 2016: Johann W. Kolar
 2015: Shu Yuen Ron Hui
 2014: Frede Blaabjerg
 2013: Rik W. De Doncker
 2012: Leo Lorenz
 2011: Praveen Jain
 2010: Akio Nakagawa
 2009: Tadashi Fukao
 2008: Istvan Nagy
 2007: Dushan Boroyevich
 2006: Deepakraj M. Divan

The following people received the William E. Newell Award from the IEEE Power Electronics Society:

 2005: Bimal K. Bose* 2000: Luigi F. Malesani
 2004: M. Azizur Rahman
 2003: Philip T. Krein
 2002: Emanuel E. Landsman
 2001: Hirofumi Akagi
 2000: Luigi F. Malesani

References

External links 
 IEEE William E. Newell Power Electronics Award page at IEEE

William E. Newell Power Electronics Award